Yevgeny Lipeyev (born 28 February 1958) is a former Soviet modern pentathlete and Olympic Champion. He competed at the 1980 Summer Olympics in Moscow, where he won a gold medal in the team competition (together with Anatoli Starostin and Pavel Lednyov), and placed 14th in the individual competition.

References

1958 births
Living people
Russian male modern pentathletes
Soviet male modern pentathletes
Olympic modern pentathletes of the Soviet Union
Modern pentathletes at the 1980 Summer Olympics
Olympic gold medalists for the Soviet Union
Olympic medalists in modern pentathlon
Medalists at the 1980 Summer Olympics